In enzymology, a L-arabinitol 4-dehydrogenase is an enzyme that catalyzes the chemical reaction

L-arabinitol + NAD+  L-xylulose + NADH + H+

Thus, the two substrates of this enzyme are L-arabinitol and NAD+, whereas its 3 products are L-xylulose, NADH, and H+.

This enzyme belongs to the family of oxidoreductases, specifically those acting on the CH-OH group of donor with NAD+ or NADP+ as acceptor. The systematic name of this enzyme class is L-arabinitol:NAD+ 4-oxidoreductase (L-xylulose-forming). Other names in common use include pentitol-DPN dehydrogenase, and L-arabitol dehydrogenase. This enzyme participates in pentose and glucuronate interconversions.

References

 
 

EC 1.1.1
NADH-dependent enzymes
Enzymes of unknown structure